Chanakya College of Pharmacy and Medical Sciences, Bhojpur is a private pharmacy college situated in Bhojpur, Bihar, India.

About college
It offers bachelor of pharmacy (B.Pharm) and diploma in pharmacy (D.Pharm) courses. This college is affiliated with the Aryabhatta Knowledge University.

See also

References

External links
http://www.chanakyfoundation.in/institutions/chanakya-college-of-pharmacy-and-medical-sciences.html
Aryabhatta Knowledge University

Colleges affiliated to Aryabhatta Knowledge University
Universities and colleges in Bihar
Educational institutions in India with year of establishment missing